One Foot in the Grave is the seventeenth studio album by the German thrash metal band Tankard. It was released on 2 June 2017, on the Nuclear Blast label.

Critical reception 

Metal Hammer Germany called the track "Arena of the True Lies" a catchy continuation of the band's previous album R.I.B and cited "Syrian Nightmare" as being singer Gerre's expression of anger about the current political situation in the Middle East. The reviewer for Rock Hard, too, praised the album as being catchy with strong lyrics, although he found the riffs too unoriginal for a thrash release.

Track listing

Charts

References

2017 albums
Tankard (band) albums
Nuclear Blast albums